XHHIH-FM is a radio station on 102.5 FM in Ojinaga, Chihuahua. The station is owned by Sistema Radio Lobo and carries a grupera format known as La Ley 102.5.

History
XHHIH was awarded to Amalia Guadalupe Quiñones Armendáriz on October 10, 1988. López de la Rocha became concessionaire in 2006.

References

Radio stations in Chihuahua